János Szarvas (born 12 September 1965) is a retired Hungarian football striker.

References

1965 births
Living people
Hungarian footballers
Békéscsaba 1912 Előre footballers
Győri ETO FC players
Association football forwards
Hungarian football managers
Békéscsaba 1912 Előre managers
People from Békéscsaba
Sportspeople from Békés County
20th-century Hungarian people